Martín Hernán Minadevino (born August 17, 1983, in Mercedes, Argentina) is an Argentinian footballer who since 2015 has played midfielder for Central Córdoba de Santiago del Estero.

Since his debut season in 2008 Minadevino has played for five clubs in 3 countries. Clubs he played for include Defensores de Belgrano, Atlético Brown and Atlético Temperley in his native country, Once Caldas in Colombia and Blooming from Bolivia.

Club career statistics

Achievements
2013/14 Primera B Metropolitana Runners-up

References

External links
 

1983 births
Living people
Argentine footballers
Argentine expatriate footballers
Primera B Metropolitana players
Bolivian Primera División players
Categoría Primera A players
Club Blooming players
Once Caldas footballers
Club Atlético Temperley footballers
Expatriate footballers in Colombia
Expatriate footballers in Bolivia
Association football midfielders
People from Mercedes, Buenos Aires
Sportspeople from Buenos Aires Province